Wu Hequan (born 16 January 1943) is a Chinese engineer who was vice president of Chinese Academy of Engineering from 2002 to 2010. He is a member of the Chinese Communist Party. He was a delegate to the 8th National People's Congress. He was a member of the 10th and 11th National Committee of the Chinese People's Political Consultative Conference.

Biography 
Wu was born in Guangzhou, Guangdong, on 16 January 1943, while his ancestral home in Panyu County (now Panyu District). In 1960, he was accepted to Wuhan University of Posts and Telecommunications. After university in 1964, he was despatched to the Research Institute of Posts and Telecommunications, Ministry of Posts and Telecommunications. He worked at the 505 Factory of Sichuan Meishan Telecom Administration from 1969 to 1975 and the Chongqing Department of Posts and Telecommunications from 1975 to 1993. In June 1993, he was appointed vice president and chief engineer of Telecommunications Science and Technology Research Institute and vice president of Datang Telecom Group. After this office was terminated in January 2002, he became vice president of Chinese Academy of Engineering, serving until January 2010. On 5 July 2013, he was proposed as chairman of the Internet Society of China.

Honours and awards 
 1988 State Science and Technology Progress Award (Second Class) for 155m / 622m SDH (synchronous digital series) optical transmission system
 1999 Member of the Chinese Academy of Engineering (CAE)
 2002 Science and Technology Progress Award of the Ho Leung Ho Lee Foundation

References 

1943 births
Living people
People from Guangzhou
Engineers from Guangdong
Members of the Chinese Academy of Engineering
Delegates to the 8th National People's Congress
Members of the 10th Chinese People's Political Consultative Conference
Members of the 11th Chinese People's Political Consultative Conference